Bernardus Maria Ignatius "Bernard" Delfgaauw (24 November 1912 – 20 August 1993) was a Dutch philosopher. He studied Dutch language and (thomistic) philosophy at the University of Amsterdam. In 1947 he earned his doctoral degree on John van Ruysbroeck. In 1961 he became a professor in philosophy at the University of Groningen.

Delfgaauw was a prolific writer; subjects included existentialism, young Marx, Thomas Aquinas, Kant, mysticism, evolution, and he developed a philosophy of grammar and of social relations. He also wrote a bestselling concise history of philosophy that was in continuous reprint and got translated into several languages.

During the Vietnam War it was legally prohibited, punishable by law in the Netherlands to say that president Johnson was a killer. In 1967 Bernard Delfgaauw said at a symposium: "Measured by criteria used in Nuremberg and Tokyo, Johnson, his staff members, and generals are war criminals."
After that, the Dutch student protesters wantonly changed their slogan from "Johnson Killer" to "Johnson Miller".

Bibliography
Teilhard de Chardin (1961)
De filosofie van Bernard Delfgaauw (1982) together with Reinout Bakker and Huib Hubbeling
'Bernard Delfgaauw et al. Evolutie en de filosofie, de biologie, de kosmos Utrecht 1967

References

1912 births
1993 deaths
University of Amsterdam alumni
Academic staff of the University of Groningen
Writers from Amsterdam
20th-century Dutch philosophers